The athletics events of the final stage of the 7th Summer Spartakiad of the Peoples of the USSR were held in the Central Lenin (Luzhniki) Stadium in Moscow between 21 July and 29 July 1979.

One world record was broken, by Marina Makeyeva in the women's 400 m hurdles.

Men's events

Women's events

References

Soviet Championships. GBR Athletics. Retrieved 2019-07-16.

Soviet Spartakiad
Spartakiad
International athletics competitions hosted by the Soviet Union
1979
1979 Spartakiad